This index is based on Macaulay’s marginal notations, which are a running analysis of the contents of the Confessio Amantis, a 33,000-line Middle English poem by John Gower. These have been used for subdivisions of the work in order to break it into smaller, more usable units and to serve as a very rough index of contents.

Some changes from the Harvard version have been made for Wikipedia purposes.
 links to the Wikipedia version of Gower's stories have been added.
 spelling of names follows Gower rather than modern usage. (This facilitates searching within CA.)

Prologue

Design of the Book; Dedication Pro.1-92
Temporal Rulers Pro.93-192
The Church Pro.193-498
The Commons; Man the cause of Evil Pro.499-584
Nebuchadnezzar's Dream; The Empires of the World; The latest Time Pro.585-848
Division the Cause of Evil Pro.848-1088

Book I

Love rules the world; example of the author Bk1.1-92
Author's woful Case; His Complaint to Cupid and Venus; The Fiery Dart; Venus Queen of Love; Genius, the priest of Love Bk1.93-202
The Lover's Shrift Bk1.203-288
The Five Senses; Seeing Bk1.289-332
Tale of Acteon Bk1.333-388.
The Tale of Medusa Bk1.389-435
Hearing; Prudence of the Serpent Bk1.436-480
Tale of the Sirens Bk1.481-529
The Sins of the Eye and Ear Bk1.530-574
The Seven deadly Sins; Pride; Five Ministers of Pride; i. Hypocrisy; Hypocrisy of Lovers Bk1.575-760
Tale of Mundus and Paulina Bk1.761-1076
The Trojan horse Bk1.1077-1189
Hypocrisy in Love Bk1.1190-1234
Inobedience Bk1.1235-1342
Murmur and Complaint Bk1.1343-1406
Tale of Florent Bk1.1407-1882
Surquidry or Presumption Bk1.1883-1976
Tale of Capaneus Bk1.1977-2020
The Trump of Death  Bk1.2021-2274
Tale of Narcissus Bk1.2275-2358
Presumption of Lovers Bk1.2359-2398
Avantance or Boasting Bk1.2399-2458
Tale of Albinus and Rosemund Bk1.2459-2680
Vain-glory Bk1.2681-2717
The Lover's Confession Bk1.2718-2784
Nabugodonosor’s Punishment Bk1.2785-3042
Humility Bk1.3043-3066
Tale of the Three Questions Bk1.3067-3402
Humility Bk1.3403-3446

Book II

Envy; Sorrow for another man's Joy Bk2.1-96
Tale of  Acis and Galatea Bk2.97-220
Joy for another man's Grief Bk2.221-290
The Travellers and the Angel (Greed and Jealousy) Bk2.291-382
Detraction; Detraction of Lovers Bk2.383-586
Tale of Constance Bk2.587-1612
Demetrius and Perseus Bk2.1613-1878
False-Semblant Bk2.1879-2144
Deianire and Nessus Bk2.2145-2326
Supplantation Bk2.2327-2458
Geta and Amphitrion Bk2.2459-2500
Tale of the False Bachelor Bk2.2501-2802
Pope Boniface Bk2.2803-3049
Joab and Ahitophel Bk2.3085-3094
Nature of Envy Bk2.3095-3161
Charity and Pity Bk2.3162-3186
The Tale of Constantine and Sylvester Bk2.3187-3530

Book III

Ire or Wrath; Melancholy Bk3.1-142
Tale of Canace and Machaire Bk3.143-360
Tiresias and the Snakes Bk3.361-394
Melancholy Bk3.395-416
Cheste Bk3.417-638
Patience of Socrates Bk3.639-730
Jupiter, Juno, and Tiresias Bk3.731-767
Cheste Bk3.768-782
Phebus and Cornide Bk3.783-817
Jupiter and Laar Bk3.818-842
Hate Bk3.843-972
King Namplus and the Greeks Bk3.973-1088
Contek and Homicide; Contek within the Heart Bk3.1089-1200
Tale of Diogenes and Alexander; Bk3.1201-1311
Contek Bk3.1312-1330
Pyramus and Thisbe Bk3.1331-1494
The Lover's Confession; Danger; More haste worse than speed Bk3.1495-1684
Tale of Phebus and Daphne Bk3.1685-1728
Fool-haste Bk3.1729-1756
Athemas and Demephon Bk3.1757-1884

Tale of Orestes Bk3.1885-2200
Lawful Homicide Bk3.2201-2250
Evil of War Bk3.2251-2362
Alexander and the Pirate Bk3.2363-2438
Wars and Death of Alexander Bk3.2439-2484
Are Crusades Lawful? Guilt of Homicide; Bk3.2485-2558
Peleus Bk3.2547-2557
A Strange Bird; Mercy Bk3.2559-2638
Tale of Telaphus and Teucer Bk3.2639-2774

Book IV

Sloth; Lachesse Bk4.1-76
Eneas and Dido Bk4.77-146
Ulixes and Penolope Bk4.147-233
Grossteste Bk4.234-243
The Foolish Virgins Bk4.254-260
Lachesse Bk4.261-312
Pusillanimity Bk4.313-370
Pymaleon and the Statue Bk4.371-450
Tale of Iphis Bk4.451-538
Forgetfulness Bk4.539-730
Demephon and Phillis Bk4.731-886
Negligence Bk4.887-978
Tale of Phebus Bk4.979-1034
Tale of Icarus Bk4.1035-1082
Idleness Bk4.1083-1244
Tale of Rosiphelee Bk4.1245-1446
Idleness in Love Bk4.1447-1504
Tale of Jephtha's Daughter Bk4.1505-1614
Lovers must approve themselves in arms Bk4.1615-1687
Arguments to the Contrary Bk4.1688-1770
The Confessor replies Bk4.1771-1814
Tale of Nauplus and Ulysses Bk4.1815-1900
Examples of Prowess; Protheselai Bk4.1901-1934
Saul Bk4.1935-1962 
Education of Achilles Bk4.1963-2023
Prowess Bk4.2024-2044
Tale of Hercules and Achelons Bk4.2045-2134
Penthesilea Bk4.2135-2164
Philemenis; Eneas Bk4.2147-2199
Gentilesse Bk4.2200-2291
Effects of Love; Love contrary to Sloth Bk4.2292-2362
Uses of labour; discoverers and inventors Bk4.2363-2456
Alchemy Bk4.2457-2530
The Three Stones of the Philosophers Bk4.2457-2603
The First Alchemists Bk4.2602-2632
Letters and Language Bk4.2633-2700
Somnolence Bk4.2701-2759
The Lover's Wakefulness Bk4.2760-2890
Dreams Bk4.2891-2926
Tale of Ceix and Alceone Bk4.2927-3123
Sleeping and Waking Bk4.3124-3186
The Prayer of Cephalus Bk4.3187-3316
Argus and Mercury Bk4.3317-3388
Tristesse or Despondency Bk4.3389-3514
Tale of Iphis and Araxarathen Bk4.3515-3712

Book V

Avarice Bk5.1-140
Tale of Midas Bk5.141-362
The Punishment of Tantalus Bk5.363-397
Avarice Bk5.402-428
Jealousy of Lovers Bk5.398-634
Tale of Vulcan and Venus Bk5.635-746
Belief of the Chaldeans Bk5.746-783
Belief of the Egyptians Orus, Typhon and Isirus Bk5.784-834
Belief of the Greeks Bk5.835-1496
Birth of Venus Bk5.843-859
Conception of Romus and Remus Bk5.883-914
Apollo Bk5.915-936
Mercury Bk5.916-952
Vulcanus Bk5.953-966
Eolus Bk5.967-980
Neptune Bk5.981-1004
Pan Bk5.1005-1042  
Bachus Bk5.1043-1058
Esculapius Bk5.1059-1082
Hercules Bk5.1083-1102
Pluto Bk5.1083-1132
Sibeles Bk5.1133-1152
Juno Bk5.1155-1188
Minerve Bk5.1189-1219
Cereres Bk5.1221-1244
Diana Bk5.1245-1276
Proserpina   Bk5.1277-1302
Nereïdes Bk5.1336-47
Origin of Idol Worship Bk5.1497-1590
Belief of the Jews Bk5.1591-1736
The Christian Faith Bk5.1737-1970
Coveitise Bk5.1971-2020
Tale of Virgil's Mirror Bk5.2031-2224
Coveitise Bk5.2225-2272
Tale of the Two Coffers Bk5.2273-2390
Tale of the Beggars and the Pasties Bk5.2391-2441
Coveitise of Lovers Bk5.2442-2642
Tale of the King and his Steward's Wife Bk5.2643-2858
False Witness and Perjury Bk5.2859-2960
Tale of Achilles and Deidamia Bk5.2961-3218
Perjury Bk5.3219-3246
Tale of Jason and Medea Bk5.3247-4242
Tale of Frixus and Hellen Bk5.4243-4382
Usury Bk5.4383-4572
Love Brokerage; Tale of Echo; Bk5.4573-4670
Parsimony Bk5.4671-4780
Tale of Babio and Croceus Bk5.4781-4884
Ingratitude Bk5.4885-4936
Tale of Adrian and Bardus Bk5.4937-5162
Ingratitude Bk5.5163-5230
Tale of Theseus and Ariadne Bk5.5231-5504
Ravine Bk5.5505-5550
Tale of Tereus Bk5.5551-6074
Robbery Bk5.6075-6144
Neptune and Corone Bk5.6145-6224
Tale of Calistona Bk5.6225-6358
Virginity; Chastity of Valentinian Bk5.6359-6492
Stealth and Michery Bk5.6493-6542
Stealth of Lovers Bk5.6543-6712
Tale of Leucothoe Bk5.6713-6896
Tale of Hercules and Faunus Bk5.6807-6960
Sacrilege Bk5.6961-7031
Sacrilege of Lovers Bk5.7032-7194
Tale of Paris and Helen Bk5.7195-7590
Sacrilege of Lovers; Divisions of Avarice Bk5.7591-7640
Prodigality and Largesse Bk5.7641-7760
Prodigality of Lovers Bk5.7761-7844

Book VI

Gluttony; Drunkenness; Bk6.1-75
Love-Drunkenness Bk6.76-324
Jupiter's Two Tuns Bk6.325-390
Prayer; Bacchus in the Desert Bk6.391-466
Love Drunkenness; Tristram Bk6.467-484
Marriage of Pirithous Bk6.485-536
Galbus and Vitellius Bk6.537-616
Delicacy; Bk6.617-664
Love-Delicacy; Delicacy Bk6.665-974
Dives and Lazarus Bk6.975-1150
Delicacy of Nero Bk6.1151-1227
Love-Delicacy Bk6.1228-1260
Sorcery and Witchcraft Bk6.1261-1390
Tale of Ulysses and Telegonus Bk6.1391-1788
Tale of Nectanabus Bk6.1789-2366
Zoroaster; Saul and the Witch; Magic to be Eschewed Bk6.2366-2440

Book VII

The Education of Alexander; Three Parts of Philosophy Bk7.1-72
Theoric (Theology) Bk7.73-134
Physics Bk7.135-144
Mathematics Bk7.145-202
Creation of the Four Elements Bk7.203-392
The Four Complexions of Man Bk7.393-489
The Soul of Man Bk7.490-520
The Division of the Earth Bk7.521-632
Astronomy Bk7.633-684
Planets and Signs Bk7.685-720
The Planets Bk7.721-954
The Signs Bk7.955-1280
The Fifteen Stars Bk7.1281-1438
Aldebaran VII.1310-1318
Pliades VII.1320-1327
Algol VII.1328 VII.1328-1336
Alhaiot VII.1337-1344
Canis maior VII.1345-1354
Canis minor VII.1355-1362
Regulus VII.1363-1370
Ala Corvi VII.1371-1378
Alaezel VII.1379-1386
Almareth VII.1387-1392
Venenas VII.1393-1400  Benenais
Alpheta Bk7.1401-1408
Cor Scorpionis Bk7.1409-16
Botercadent Bk7.1417-1424
tail of Scorpio Bk7.1425-32
Authors of the Science of Astronomy Bk7.1439-1506
Rhetoric Bk7.1507-1640
Practicique; Five Points of Policy Bk7.1641-1710
The First Point of Policy; Truth Bk7.1711-1782
King, Wine, Woman, and Truth Bk7.1783-1984
Daires Bk7.1783-1984
Tale of Alcestis Bk7.1917-1949
The Second Point of Policy. Liberality Bk7.1985-2060
Tale of Julius and the Poor Knight Bk7.2014-2057
Tale of Julius and the Poor Knight Bk7.2061-2114
Antigonus and Cinichus Bk7.2115-
Discretion in Giving Bk7.2115-2130
Prodigality of Kings  Bk7.2131-2176
Flatterers Bk7.2177-2216
Tale of Diogenes and Aristippus Bk7.2217-2317
Flattery Bk7.2318-2354
The Roman Triumph Bk7.2355-2411
The Emperor and his Masons Bk7.2412-2448
Caesar's Answer Bk7.2449-2490
Flatterers of a King Bk7.2491-2526
Ahab and Micaiah Bk7.2527-2694
Justice Bk7.2695-2764
Justice of Maximin Bk7.2765-2782
Gaius Fabricius Bk7.2783-2832
The Emperor Conrad Bk7.2833-2844
The Consul Carmidotirus Bk7.2845-2888
Example of Cambyses Bk7.2889-2916
Lycurgus and his Laws Bk7.2917-3028
The First Lawgivers Bk7.3029-3061
Kings must keep the Laws Bk7.3062-3102
The Fourth Point of Policy; Pity Bk7.3103-3162
Troian  Bk7.3142-3162
The Jew and the Pagan  in Stafford MS not in Fairfax 
The Tale of Codrus Bk7.3163-3214
Pompeie and the King of Armenia Bk7.3215-3248
Cruelty Bk7.3249-3266
Cruelty of Justinian and Leontius Bk7.3267-3294
Cruelty of Siculus Bk7.3295-3340
Dionysius and his Horses Bk7.3341-3354
Lichaon Bk7.3355-3386
Nobleness of the Lion Bk7.3387-3416
Spertachus and Thamaris Bk7.3417-3513
Mercy must be without Weakness Bk7.3514-3552
The Mountain and the Mouse Bk7.3553-3593
There is a time for War Bk7.3594-3626
Story of Gideon Bk7.3627-3806
Saul and Agag Bk7.3807-3845
David and Joab Bk7.3846-3890
Solomon's Wisdom Bk7.3891-3944
The Courtiers and the Fool Bk7.3945-4026
Folly of Roboas Bk7.4027-4146
Wisdom in a King's Council Bk7.4147-4166
Mercy and Justice Bk7.4167-4214
Anthonius Bk7.4181-4188
The Fifth Point of Policy. Chastity Bk7.4215-4312
Evil Example of Sardana Pallus Bk7.4313-4343
Barbarus Bk7.4331-4344
David Bk7.4344-4360
Cyrus and the Lydians Bk7.4361-4405
The Counsel of Balaam Bk7.4406-4468
Evil Example of Solomon Bk7.4469-4514
Division of His Kingdom Bk7.4515-4573
Anthonie Bk7.4574-4592
Tarquin and his son Aruns Bk7.4593-4753
The Rape of Lucrece Bk7.4754-5130
Tale of Virginius Bk7.5131-5306
Tobias and Sara Bk7.5307-5365
Chastity Bk7.5366-5438

Book VIII

Lechery; The Origins of Mankind Bk8.1-66
Laws of Marriage Bk8.67-198
Examples of Incest; Caligula; Ammon Bk8.199-222
Lot and his Daughters; Incest Bk8.223-270
Apollonius of Tyre Bk8.271-2018
The Lover requires Counsel Bk8. 2029-2062
The Confessor replies Bk8. 2150-2148
The Controversy Bk8. 2149-2216
The Supplication Bk8.2217-2300
Venus replies to the Supplication Bk8.2301-2376
Venus replies to the Supplication (continued) Bk8.2377-2439
The Companies of Lovers Bk8.2440-2744
Cupid and the Lover; Bk8.2745-2787
The Fiery Dart withdrawn Bk8.2788-2807
The Healing of Love; The Absolution Bk8.2809-2897
Leave-taking of Venus Bk8.2899-2970
Author Prays for the State of England; Bk8.2971-2994
Evil of Division in the Land Bk8.2995-3053
The Duty of a King Bk8.2971-3105
The Book Completed Bk8.3106-3137
Farewell to Earthly Love; Heavenly Love Bk8.3138-3172

Gower's Revisions

Design of the Book; Dedication CAvarPro.24*-92*
Virginity; example of Valentinianus introduced CAvar5.6395*-6439*
Tale of Lucius and the Statue CAvar5.7016*-7210*
Example of Dante CAvar7.2329*-2342*
Pity; example of Alexander CAvar7.3149*-3180*
Tale of the Jew and the Pagan CAvar7.3207*-3360*
Leave-taking of Venus CAvar8.2941*-2970*
Author prays for the King; The King commended CAvar8.2971*-3043*
The Author presents his Book to the King CAvar8.3044*-3069*
Farewell to Earthly Love; Heavenly Love CAvar8.3070*-3114*

Sources
 (based on Macaulay 1901)
Macaulay facsimile edition includes Introduction, Marginal notations and Notes
  first half of Confessio Amantis(to V.1970)
  second half of Confessio Amantis (from V.1970)

Other Reading

References

Lists of stories